No One Man is a 1932 American pre-Code drama film starring Carole Lombard and Ricardo Cortez, and directed by Lloyd Corrigan. It is based on a novel by Rupert Hughes.

Plot
Penelope Newbold is a wealthy divorcée looking to remarry. She falls for her physician, Dr. Karl Bemis, but ends up marrying Bill Hanaway. He then has an affair with another woman. After Bill dies of a heart attack, Penelope and Dr. Bemis come together.

Cast
Carole Lombard : Penelope Newbold
Ricardo Cortez :	Bill Hanaway
Paul Lukas : Dr. Karl Bemis
Juliette Compton : Sue Folsom
George Barbier : Alfred Newbold
Virginia Hammond : Mrs. Newbold
Arthur Pierson : Stanley McIlvaine

See also
The House That Shadows Built (1931), a Paramount promotional film with excerpts from No One Man

References

External links

1932 drama films
1932 films
American drama films
American black-and-white films
Paramount Pictures films
Films with screenplays by Sidney Buchman
Films based on works by Rupert Hughes
Films directed by Lloyd Corrigan
1930s American films